Hossein Dehghani Poudeh (born 2 March 1957), commonly known as Hossein Dehghan, is a former IRGC air force officer with the rank of brigadier general and the former minister of defense of Iran. He was designated for the position by President Hassan Rouhani on 4 August 2013 and confirmed by the parliament on 15 August. He left the office on 20 August 2017.

Early life and education
Dehghani was born in a village near Shahreza, called Pudeh, Dehaqan County, Isfahan province, in 1957. He received a PhD in management from the University of Tehran.

Career and activities
Dehghani served as a commander in the Iranian Revolution Guards Corps (IRGC) and in its air force. He left his hometown for Tehran and joined the IRGC shortly after the Iranian revolution in 1979. His posts at the IRGC include commander of IRGC of Tehran (1980-1982), Isfahan, and Syria and Lebanon (1982-1983), and general manager of the IRGC's Cooperatives Foundation (1996).

During the Iran-Iraq war, he was among leading and decision-making commanders of the IRGC along with Mohsen Rezaee, Rahim Safavi and Ali Shamkhani. In Syria and Lebanon he was the commander of the training corps of the IRGC. He was named the IRGC's air force deputy commander in 1986 and became its commander in April 1990. His tenure lasted until 1992 and he was replaced by Mohammad Hossein Jalali in the post. Dehghani was named deputy chief of the IRGC Joint Staff in 1992. He later was promoted to the rank of brigadier general.

Next he served as deputy to the then defense minister, Ali Shamkhani, during the presidency of Mohammad Khatami from 1997 to 2003. In 2003, he held the post of acting defense minister. He was made Vice President of Iran and head of the martyrs foundation, "Bonyad Shahid", in 2005 and served as its president until July 2009. In addition, he served as an advisor to the former President Mahmoud Ahmedinejad. From 2009 to 2010 he was the deputy to Ali Shamkhani in the Armed Forces Strategic Studies Center. Then he was appointed secretary of the Expediency Council's political, defense and security committee in 2010. He also served as an advisor to Speaker of Parliament Ali Larijani and Tehran Mayor Mohammad Bagher Qalibaf. However, Dehghani distanced himself from Ahmedinejad in 2012 and joined Moderation and Development Party led by Hassan Rouhani.  
 
He was nominated to head the defense ministry on 4 August 2013. He was approved by the Majlis and replaced Ahmad Vahidi in the post. Dehghani received 269 votes in favor and 10 votes against. Former Oil Minister Rostam Qasemi was named as Dehghani's advisor on 22 August. On 1 August 2017, Dehghani announced that he will leave defense ministry after the end of the first Rouhani government. He currently serves as an advisor to Supreme Leader Ayatollah Ali Khamenei.

He has announced he will be running in the 2021 Iranian presidential election.

Sanctions
In November 2019, Deghgan was among many Iranian officials placed under the sanctions list by the United States Department of State due to his involvement as an IRGC commander in the 1983 Beirut barracks bombings which alleged Hezbollah militants killed 241 American soldiers.

References

External links

1957 births
Living people
Islamic Revolutionary Guard Corps brigadier generals
Defence ministers of Iran
Iranian Vice Ministers
Muslim Student Followers of the Imam's Line
People from Isfahan Province
University of Tehran alumni
Recipients of the Order of Courage (Iran)
Heads of Foundation of Martyrs and Veterans Affairs
Islamic Revolutionary Guard Corps personnel of the Iran–Iraq War
Quds Force personnel
Iranian individuals subject to the U.S. Department of the Treasury sanctions